Stanislav Jánský is a former Czechoslovak slalom canoeist who competed in the 1950s. He won a gold medal in the C-1 team event at the 1953 ICF Canoe Slalom World Championships in Meran.

References

Czechoslovak male canoeists
Possibly living people
Year of birth missing (living people)
Medalists at the ICF Canoe Slalom World Championships